Kate Evers (Née McMeeken-Ruscoe) (born 19 December 1979 in Christchurch, New Zealand) is a basketball player for New Zealand. At the 2006 Commonwealth Games she won a silver medal as part of the Tall Ferns New Zealand women's basketball team.

Kate is a married to her wife, Kyla Evers and they got married in Honolulu, Hawaii, U.S.A.

She currently plays for the Townsville Fire women's basketball team.

She played college basketball in the United States at the University at Buffalo.

Hawai'i and Buffalo statistics 

Source

References

1979 births
Living people
New Zealand women's basketball players
Basketball players at the 2006 Commonwealth Games
Commonwealth Games silver medallists for New Zealand
Basketball players at the 2008 Summer Olympics
Sportspeople from Christchurch
Olympic basketball players of New Zealand
Commonwealth Games medallists in basketball
Buffalo Bulls women's basketball players
Netball players from Christchurch
Territory Storm players
Medallists at the 2006 Commonwealth Games